Critters 3 is a 1991 American science fiction comedy horror Direct-to-video film and the third installment of the Critters series, directed by Kristine Peterson. Cary Elwes mentioned on the commentary for the uncut edition DVD of Shin Saw that he passed on the role of Josh. It was shot simultaneously (from February to July 1991) with its sequel, Critters 4. Unlike the first two films, it does not take place in the town of Grover's Bend. It marked Leonardo DiCaprio's film debut.

Plot 
Sometime after the events in Critters 2: The Main Course, Charlie MacFadden is tracking down the last of the Critters. A family of three – Annie (the main protagonist), Johnny (her little brother) and Clifford (the father) – stops at a rest stop when their car's tire pops. At the rest stop, Charlie warns them and Josh, stepson of a corrupt landlord, about the Critters. As this happens, a Critter lays eggs under the family's car and the family leaves, unknowingly taking the eggs with them. Soon after they arrive at their tenement, the Critters hatch and attack the sleazy maintenance man, Frank. When the landlord arrives, he too is eaten by the Critters after Josh locks him in Clifford's room, unknowingly trapping his stepfather with the creatures. Next, one of the residents is attacked and wounded. Annie, her family and five others (including Josh) try to get to safety in one piece by getting to the roof of the building. Charlie arrives and destroys the remaining Critters, saving the remaining tenants. The film ends in a cliffhanger as Charlie is about to destroy two Critter eggs, but is ordered not to and a containment pod sent from the Intergalactic Council crashes into the basement.

Cast 
 Leonardo DiCaprio as Josh
 Aimee Brooks as Annie
 Don Keith Opper as Charlie MacFadden
 John Calvin as Clifford
 Nina Axelrod as Betty Briggs
 William Dennis Hunt as Briggs
 Geoffrey Blake as Frank
 Christian & Joseph Cousins as Johnny
 Terrence Mann as Ug
 Jose Luis Valenzuela as Mario
 Diana Bellamy as Rosalie
 Katherine Cortez as Marcia
 Frances Bay as Mrs. Menges
 Bill Zuckert as Mr. Menges
William Hanna as Critter's screams and shrieks

Release 
The film was released direct to video by New Line Home Video on December 11, 1991. New Line Home Entertainment released it on DVD in 2003. The film was re-released in a set containing four films on DVD by Warner Bros. in 2010.

Scream Factory, a subsidiary of Shout! Factory, released the four films as part of "The Critters Collection" on Blu-ray. The set was available from November 27, 2018.

Reception 
Review aggregation website Rotten Tomatoes gives the film an approval rating of 0%, based on reviews from six critics, with an average rating of 2.8/10.

References

External links 

 
 
 

1991 horror films
1991 films
1990s monster movies
1990s science fiction horror films
American comedy horror films
American monster movies
American science fiction horror films
Direct-to-video sequel films
Puppet films
Films set in apartment buildings
Films set in Los Angeles
Films shot in Los Angeles
New Line Cinema direct-to-video films
Critters (franchise)
1990s English-language films
Films directed by Kristine Peterson
1990s American films